The 2016 London Broncos season was the thirty-seventh in the club's history and their second consecutive season out of the Super League. Competing in the 2016 Kingstone Press Championship, the club was coached by Andrew Henderson, finishing in 2nd place and reaching the Fourth Round of the 2016 Challenge Cup. They failed to achieve promotion after finishing 6th place in the 2016 Super League Qualifiers.

It was their first season at the Ealing Trailfinders Sports Ground. They exited the Challenge Cup with a defeat by Featherstone Rovers.

2016 milestones

2016 squad

2016 tables

Regular season

C = Champions

Q = Qualified for the qualifiers

F = Unable to qualify for the qualifiers

Qualifiers

Standings

(Q) = Qualified for Super League XXII

(S) = Secured spot in Million Pound Game

(R) = Relegated to the Championship

References

External links
2016 Championship - Rugby League Project

London Broncos seasons
London Broncos season
2016 in rugby league by club
2016 in English rugby league